Shaquill "Shaq" Griffin  (born July 20, 1995) is an American football cornerback who is a free agent. He is the twin brother of former linebacker Shaquem Griffin, and both brothers played college football for the University of Central Florida Knights. Griffin was drafted by the Seattle Seahawks in the third round of the 2017 NFL Draft.

Early life
Shaquill Griffin was born to Tangie and Terry Griffin on July 20, 1995, in St. Petersburg Florida, less than two minutes before Shaquem. Shaquill and Shaquem competed together in track, baseball, and football.

High school career
Griffin attended Lakewood High School in St. Petersburg, Florida. He played high school football for the Spartans. He chose to attend UCF after high school.

College career
Griffin played for the University of Central Florida (UCF) Knights from 2013 to 2016, rejecting offers from other teams including the Miami Hurricanes, his dream team, to play with his twin brother Shaquem. He left UCF one season before Shaquem, as Shaquem redshirted his freshman year while Shaquill saw playing time.

As a freshman, Shaquill recorded six total tackles and one pass defensed in four games. As a sophomore, Shaquill recorded 15 total tackles and an interception in six games. As a junior, he recorded 43 total tackles, one interception returned for a touchdown (against Temple), and 11 passes defensed in 11 games. As a senior, he recorded 49 total tackles, four interceptions (one against Tulane returned for a touchdown), 15 passes defensed, and one fumble recovery.

College statistics

Professional career
Griffin accepted his invitation to the NFLPA Collegiate Bowl. On January 24, 2017, he appeared in the NFLPA Collegiate Bowl for Jim Zorn's American team and recorded three combined tackles as they lost 27–7 to the National team. He was one of 35 collegiate cornerbacks to be invited to the NFL Scouting Combine in Indianapolis, Indiana. Griffin was a top performer among his position group, finishing second in the broad jump, third in the vertical jump, and ran the fourth-fastest 40-yard dash among all defensive backs. On March 22, 2017, Griffin attended Central Florida's pro day, but opted to stand on his combine numbers and only performed positional drills for team representatives and scouts from 20 NFL teams and three CFL teams. Throughout the draft process, Griffin had private workouts and visits with multiple teams, including the Pittsburgh Steelers, Tennessee Titans, Detroit Lions, Indianapolis Colts, San Francisco 49ers, Seattle Seahawks, Dallas Cowboys, and Philadelphia Eagles. At the conclusion of the pre-draft process, Griffin was projected to be a third- or fourth-round pick by NFL draft experts and scouts. He was ranked the 17th-best cornerback prospect in the draft by NFLDraftScout.com.

Seattle Seahawks
The Seattle Seahawks selected Griffin in the third round (90th overall) of the 2017 NFL Draft. He was the 13th cornerback selected in 2017.

2017
On June 15, 2017, the Seattle Seahawks signed Griffin to a four-year, $3.25 million contract that includes a signing bonus of $758,620. Griffin joined the defensive unit nicknamed the Legion of Boom for its final season.

Throughout training camp, Griffin competed against Jeremy Lane, DeShawn Shead, and Neiko Thorpe for the starting cornerback job. Head coach Pete Carroll named Griffin the fourth cornerback on the depth chart behind Richard Sherman, Jeremy Lane, and Neiko Thorpe.

He made his professional regular season debut in the Seattle Seahawks' season-opener at the Green Bay Packers and made a season-high ten combined tackles and deflected one pass during their 17–9 loss. Griffin played the majority of the game after Jeremy Lane was ejected in the first quarter after allegedly throwing a punch at Packers wide receiver Davante Adams. On October 8, 2017, Griffin made his first career start after Jeremy Lane was inactive after suffering a groin injury during their Week 4 victory over the Indianapolis Colts. He finished the Seahawks' 16–10 win against the Los Angeles Rams with six solo tackles and one pass deflection. The following week, Griffin earned his second consecutive start with Lane still inactive and recorded three solo tackles and a season-high three pass deflections in Seattle's 24–7 victory at the New York Giants. After Lane returned from injury, head coach Pete Carroll stated Griffin would remain the starting cornerback entering Week 8.

On November 20, 2017, Griffin recorded one solo tackle before leaving the Seahawks' 34–31 loss to the Atlanta Falcons in the first quarter after suffering a concussion. He remained in concussion protocol and was inactive for the Seahawks' 24–13 victory at the San Francisco 49ers in Week 12. During a Week 16 matchup at the Dallas Cowboys, Griffin collected five combined tackles and made his first career sack on Dak Prescott as the Seahawks defeated them 21–12. On December 31, 2017, Griffin recorded six solo tackles, deflected two passes, and made his first career interception during their 26–24 loss to the Arizona Cardinals. His first career interception came in the third quarter off a pass attempt by Drew Stanton intended for Jaron Brown. He finished the  season with 59 combined tackles (50 solo), 15 pass deflections, one interception, and one sack in 15 games and 11 starts. Pro Football Focus gave Griffin an overall grade of 77.2, ranking as the 58th-highest grade among all qualified cornerbacks in 2017.

2018

Shaquill was reunited with his twin brother Shaquem Griffin in the 2018 season, as Shaquem was drafted by the Seahawks in the fifth round (141st overall) of the 2018 NFL Draft on April 28, 2018.

On September 17, 2018, Griffin notched two interceptions and three pass deflections against Chicago Bears quarterback Mitchell Trubisky in a 17-24 road loss at Soldier Field.

2019
Griffin was named to the Pro Bowl on January 17, 2020 as an alternate.

2020
In Week 3 against the Dallas Cowboys, Griffin recorded his first interception of the season (and since 2018) off a pass thrown by Dak Prescott during the 38–31 win.
In Week 4 against the Miami Dolphins, Griffin recorded another interception, this time thrown by Ryan Fitzpatrick, during the 31–23 win. 
In Week 15 against the Washington Football Team, Griffin intercepted a pass thrown by Dwayne Haskins during the 20–15 win, setting a single season career high with his third.

Jacksonville Jaguars
On March 17, 2021, Griffin signed a three-year, $44.5 million contract with the Jacksonville Jaguars.

On October 26, 2022, Griffin was placed on injured reserve after suffering a back injury in Week 6.

On March 8, 2023, Griffin was released by the Jaguars.

Bibliography
 Shaquem Griffin and Shaquill Griffin with Mark Schlabach, Inseparable: How Family and Sacrifice Forged a Path to the NFL. W Publishing Group, 2019. .

References

External links
UCF Knights bio
Seattle Seahawks bio

1995 births
Living people
African-American players of American football
American football cornerbacks
Jacksonville Jaguars players
Players of American football from St. Petersburg, Florida
Seattle Seahawks players
American twins
Twin sportspeople
UCF Knights football players
21st-century African-American sportspeople
National Conference Pro Bowl players